Savita Vaidhyanathan is an American politician who served as the mayor of Cupertino, California. Vaidhyanathan is the first Mayor of Indian descent for the city of Cupertino. Vaidhyanathan was elected to the Cupertino City Council in 2014. She served as mayor from 2017 to 2018.

Personal life 
Vaidhyanathan was born in India. She holds a B.A in Math (Honors) from St. Stephens College, a B.Ed from Lucknow University, & an MBA from San Jose State University. She is married to R. 'Doc' Vaidhyanathan and has one daughter, Anagha Vaidhyanathan.

Political career 
On March 1, 2017, Vaidhyanathan delivered the state of the city address in which she provided updates on Apple Park, the recent opening of Main Street, and the approval of the Hamptons Apartments and Marina Plaza mixed-use project. Vaidhyanathan will serve as mayor during the opening of the new Apple Park.

Vaidhyanathan called on law enforcement and the sheriff's department to hold a town hall meeting focused on immigrant rights. Vaidhyanathan spoke at an anti-hate rally in Palo Alto. She and the Cupertino City Council passed a resolution "to protecting the constitutional rights of its residents."

References

American mayors of Indian descent
American politicians of Indian descent
California politicians of Indian descent
Living people
People from Cupertino, California
St. Stephen's College, Delhi alumni
University of Lucknow alumni
Indian emigrants to the United States
Women mayors of places in California
1952 births
21st-century American women